Janotka is a Slavic surname. Notable people with the surname include:

 Ferdinand Janotka (born 1945), Austrian footballer and manager
 Tomáš Janotka (born 1982), Czech footballer

Slavic-language surnames